Jean Frechaut (19 September 191416 April 2012) was a French professional road bicycle racer. Frechaut won three stages in the 1938 Tour de France. He was born in Bordeaux.

Major results

1937
Tour de France:
10th place overall classification
1938
Tour de France:
Winner stages 9, 12 and 17B

References

External links 

Official Tour de France results for Jean Frechaut

French male cyclists
1914 births
2012 deaths
French Tour de France stage winners
Sportspeople from Bordeaux
Cyclists from Nouvelle-Aquitaine